Richard Olson (born 23 September 2003) is a Swedish–German racing driver who competes in the Swedish Kart League and SKCC with AD Motorsport.

Career

Karting 
Olson started karting in 2019. He competed in two races that year with PDB Racing Team Sweden. The following year, Olson competed in 23 races across Sweden and finished 3rd, 4th and 38th in that years championships.

The 2021 season would come to a halt for Olson after an arm fracture in the first race. After a return in August he won Kart Cup Väst and finished 13th in SKCC.

Now in 2022 Olson is currently third in the Swedish Kart League and leading SKCC. Olson made his International Karting debut in June when he competed in one of the European Championship rounds in Kristianstad. He finished in 58th position.

Personal life 
Richard was born in Gothenburg, Sweden, but he is however half German on his mother's side. Richard's father Denny Olson and grandfather Sven Olson were both Swedish musicians.

Karting record

Karting career summary

References

External links 

 Richard Olson career summary at DriverDB.com
 Official website



2003 births
Living people
Swedish racing drivers